Pseudodirphia eumedide is a moth of the family Saturniidae first described by Caspar Stoll in 1782. It is found in Suriname, French Guiana, Peru, Venezuela and Panama.

References

Moths described in 1782
Hemileucinae